In the mathematical field of geometric topology, the Poincaré conjecture is a theorem about the characterization of the 3-sphere, which is the hypersphere that bounds the unit ball in four-dimensional space.

Originally conjectured by Henri Poincaré in 1904, the theorem concerns spaces that locally look like ordinary three-dimensional space but which are finite in extent. Poincaré hypothesized that if such a space has the additional property that each loop in the space can be continuously tightened to a point, then it is necessarily a three-dimensional sphere. Attempts to resolve the conjecture drove much progress in the field of geometric topology during the 20th century.

The eventual proof built upon Richard S. Hamilton's program of using the Ricci flow to solve the problem. By developing a number of new techniques and results in the theory of Ricci flow, Grigori Perelman was able to modify and complete Hamilton's program. In papers posted to the arXiv repository in 2002 and 2003, Perelman presented his work proving the Poincaré conjecture (and the more powerful geometrization conjecture of William Thurston). Over the next several years, several mathematicians studied his papers and produced detailed formulations of his work.

Hamilton and Perelman's work on the conjecture is widely recognized as a milestone of mathematical research. Hamilton was recognized with the Shaw Prize and the Leroy P. Steele Prize for Seminal Contribution to Research. The journal Science marked Perelman's proof of the Poincaré conjecture as the scientific Breakthrough of the Year in 2006. The Clay Mathematics Institute, having included the Poincaré conjecture in their well-known Millennium Prize Problem list, offered Perelman their prize of US$1 million for the conjecture's resolution. He declined the award, saying that Hamilton's contribution had been equal to his own.<ref name="interfax">{{cite web|title=Последнее "нет" доктора Перельмана|trans-title=The last "no" Dr. Perelman|url=http://www.interfax.ru/society/txt.asp?id=143603|website=Interfax|access-date=5 April 2016|language=ru|date=July 1, 2010}}

History

Poincaré's question

Henri Poincaré was working on the foundations of topology—what would later be called combinatorial topology and then algebraic topology.  He was particularly interested in what topological properties characterized a sphere.

Poincaré claimed in 1900 that homology, a tool he had devised based on prior work by Enrico Betti, was sufficient to tell if a 3-manifold was a 3-sphere.  However, in a 1904 paper, he described a counterexample to this claim, a space now called the Poincaré homology sphere.  The Poincaré sphere was the first example of a homology sphere, a manifold that had the same homology as a sphere, of which many others have since been constructed.  To establish that the Poincaré sphere was different from the 3-sphere, Poincaré introduced a new topological invariant, the fundamental group, and showed that the Poincaré sphere had a fundamental group of order 120, while the 3-sphere had a trivial fundamental group.  In this way, he was able to conclude that these two spaces were, indeed, different.

In the same paper, Poincaré wondered whether a 3-manifold with the homology of a 3-sphere and also trivial fundamental group had to be a 3-sphere.  Poincaré's new condition—i.e., "trivial fundamental group"—can be restated as "every loop can be shrunk to a point."

The original phrasing was as follows:

Poincaré never declared whether he believed this additional condition would characterize the 3-sphere, but nonetheless, the statement that it does is known as the Poincaré conjecture.  Here is the standard form of the conjecture:

Note that "closed" here means, as customary in this area, the condition of being compact in terms of set topology, and also without boundary (3-dimensional Euclidean space is an example of a simply connected 3-manifold not homeomorphic to the 3-sphere; but it is not compact and therefore not a counter-example).

Solutions
In the 1930s, J. H. C. Whitehead claimed a proof but then retracted it.

In the 1950s and 1960s, other  mathematicians attempted proofs of the conjecture only to discover that they contained flaws.  Influential mathematicians such as Georges de Rham, R. H. Bing, Wolfgang Haken, Edwin E. Moise, and Christos Papakyriakopoulos attempted to prove the conjecture.  In 1958, Bing proved a weak version of the Poincaré conjecture: if every simple closed curve of a compact 3-manifold is contained in a 3-ball, then the manifold is homeomorphic to the 3-sphere.  Bing also described some of the pitfalls in trying to prove the Poincaré conjecture.

Włodzimierz Jakobsche showed in 1978 that, if the Bing–Borsuk conjecture is true in dimension 3, then the Poincaré conjecture must also be true.

Over time, the conjecture gained the reputation of being particularly tricky to tackle.  John Milnor commented that sometimes the errors in false proofs can be "rather subtle and difficult to detect."  Work on the conjecture improved understanding of 3-manifolds.  Experts in the field were often reluctant to announce proofs and tended to view any such announcement with skepticism.  The 1980s and 1990s witnessed some well-publicized fallacious proofs (which were not actually published in peer-reviewed form).

An exposition of attempts to prove this conjecture can be found in the non-technical book Poincaré's Prize by George Szpiro.

Dimensions

The classification of closed surfaces gives an affirmative answer to the analogous question in two dimensions.  For dimensions greater than three, one can pose the Generalized Poincaré conjecture: is a homotopy n-sphere homeomorphic to the n-sphere?  A stronger assumption is necessary; in dimensions four and higher there are simply-connected, closed manifolds which are not homotopy equivalent to an n-sphere.

Historically, while the conjecture in dimension three seemed plausible, the generalized conjecture was thought to be false.  In 1961, Stephen Smale shocked mathematicians by proving the Generalized Poincaré conjecture for dimensions greater than four and extended his techniques to prove the fundamental h-cobordism theorem.  In 1982, Michael Freedman proved the Poincaré conjecture in four dimensions.  Freedman's work left open the possibility that there is a smooth four-manifold homeomorphic to the four-sphere which is not diffeomorphic to the four-sphere.  This so-called smooth Poincaré conjecture, in dimension four, remains open and is thought to be very difficult.  Milnor's exotic spheres show that the smooth Poincaré conjecture is false in dimension seven, for example.

These earlier successes in higher dimensions left the case of three dimensions in limbo.  The Poincaré conjecture was essentially true in both dimension four and all higher dimensions for substantially different reasons.  In dimension three, the conjecture had an uncertain reputation until the geometrization conjecture put it into a framework governing all 3-manifolds.  John Morgan wrote:

Hamilton's program and solution

Hamilton's program was started in his 1982 paper in which he introduced the Ricci flow on a manifold and showed how to use it to prove some special cases of the Poincaré conjecture.  In the following years, he extended this work but was unable to prove the conjecture.  The actual solution was not found until Grigori Perelman published his papers.

In late 2002 and 2003, Perelman posted three papers on the arXiv.  In these papers, he sketched a proof of the Poincaré conjecture and a more general conjecture, Thurston's geometrization conjecture, completing the Ricci flow program outlined earlier by Richard S. Hamilton.

From May to July 2006, several groups presented papers that filled in the details of Perelman's proof of the Poincaré conjecture, as follows:
 Bruce Kleiner and John W. Lott posted a paper on the arXiv in May 2006 which filled in the details of Perelman's proof of the geometrization conjecture, following partial versions which had been publicly available since 2003. Their manuscript was published in the journal "Geometry and Topology" in 2008. A small number of corrections were made in 2011 and 2013; for instance, the first version of their published paper made use of an incorrect version of Hamilton's compactness theorem for Ricci flow.
 Huai-Dong Cao and Xi-Ping Zhu published a paper in the June 2006 issue of the Asian Journal of Mathematics with an exposition of the complete proof of the Poincaré and geometrization conjectures. The opening paragraph of their paper stated

Some observers interpreted Cao and Zhu as taking credit for Perelman's work. They later posted a revised version, with new wording, on the arXiv. In addition, a page of their exposition was essentially identical to a page in one of Kleiner and Lott's early publicly available drafts; this was also amended in the revised version, together with an apology by the journal's editorial board.
 John Morgan and Gang Tian posted a paper on the arXiv in July 2006 which gave a detailed proof of just the Poincaré Conjecture (which is somewhat easier than the full geometrization conjecture) and expanded this to a book.

All three groups found that the gaps in Perelman's papers were minor and could be filled in using his own techniques.

On August 22, 2006, the ICM awarded Perelman the Fields Medal for his work on the Ricci flow, but Perelman refused the medal. John Morgan spoke at the ICM on the Poincaré conjecture on August 24, 2006, declaring that "in 2003, Perelman solved the Poincaré Conjecture."

In December 2006, the journal Science honored the proof of Poincaré conjecture as the Breakthrough of the Year and featured it on its cover.

Ricci flow with surgery

Hamilton's program for proving the Poincaré conjecture involves first putting a Riemannian metric on the unknown simply connected closed 3-manifold. The basic idea is to try to "improve" this metric; for example, if the metric can be improved enough so that it has constant positive curvature, then according to classical results in Riemannian geometry, it must be the 3-sphere.  Hamilton prescribed the "Ricci flow equations" for improving the metric;

where g is the metric and R its Ricci curvature, and one hopes that, as the time t increases, the manifold becomes easier to understand.  Ricci flow expands the negative curvature part of the manifold and contracts the positive curvature part.

According to classical Riemannian geometry, the only simply-connected compact manifold which can support a Riemannian metric of constant positive curvature is the sphere. So, in effect, Hamilton showed a special case of the Poincaré conjecture: if a compact simply-connected 3-manifold supports a Riemannian metric of positive Ricci curvature, then it must be diffeomorphic to the 3-sphere.

If, instead, one only has an arbitrary Riemannian metric, the Ricci flow equations must lead to more complicated singularities. Perelman's major achievement was to show that, if one takes a certain perspective, if they appear in finite time, these singularities can only look like shrinking spheres or cylinders. With a quantitative understanding of this phenomenon, he cuts the manifold along the singularities, splitting the manifold into several pieces and then continues with the Ricci flow on each of these pieces.  This procedure is known as Ricci flow with surgery.

Perelman provided a separate argument based on curve shortening flow to show that, on a simply-connected compact 3-manifold, any solution of the Ricci flow with surgery becomes extinct in finite time. An alternative argument, based on the min-max theory of minimal surfaces and geometric measure theory, was provided by Tobias Colding and William Minicozzi. Hence, in the simply-connected context, the above finite-time phenomena of Ricci flow with surgery is all that is relevant. In fact, this is even true if the fundamental group is a free product of finite groups and cyclic groups.

This condition on the fundamental group turns out to be necessary and sufficient for finite time extinction.  It is equivalent to saying that the prime decomposition of the manifold has no acyclic components and turns out to be equivalent to the condition that all geometric pieces of the manifold have geometries based on the two Thurston geometries S2×R and S3.  In the context that one makes no assumption about the fundamental group whatsoever, Perelman made a further technical study of the limit of the manifold for infinitely large times, and in so doing, proved Thurston's geometrization conjecture: at large times, the manifold has a thick-thin decomposition, whose thick piece has a hyperbolic structure, and whose thin piece is a graph manifold. Due to Perelman's and Colding and Minicozzi's results, however, these further results are unnecessary in order to prove the Poincaré conjecture.

Solution

On November 13, 2002, Russian mathematician Grigori Perelman posted the first of a series of three eprints on arXiv outlining a solution of the Poincaré conjecture. Perelman's proof uses a modified version of a Ricci flow program developed by Richard S. Hamilton. In August 2006, Perelman was awarded, but declined, the Fields Medal (worth $15,000 CAD) for his work on the Ricci flow. On March 18, 2010, the Clay Mathematics Institute awarded Perelman the $1 million Millennium Prize in recognition of his proof. Perelman rejected that prize as well.

Perelman proved the conjecture by deforming the manifold using the Ricci flow (which behaves similarly to the heat equation that describes the diffusion of heat through an object). The Ricci flow usually deforms the manifold towards a rounder shape, except for some cases where it stretches the manifold apart from itself towards what are known as singularities. Perelman and Hamilton then chop the manifold at the singularities (a process called "surgery"), causing the separate pieces to form into ball-like shapes.  Major steps in the proof involve showing how manifolds behave when they are deformed by the Ricci flow, examining what sort of singularities develop, determining whether this surgery process can be completed, and establishing that the surgery need not be repeated infinitely many times.

The first step is to deform the manifold using the Ricci flow. The Ricci flow was defined by Richard S. Hamilton as a way to deform manifolds.   The formula for the Ricci flow is an imitation of the heat equation, which describes the way heat flows in a solid. Like the heat flow, Ricci flow tends towards uniform behavior. Unlike the heat flow, the Ricci flow could run into singularities and stop functioning.   A singularity in a manifold is a place where it is not differentiable: like a corner or a cusp or a pinching.   The Ricci flow was only defined for smooth differentiable manifolds.  Hamilton used the Ricci flow to prove that some compact manifolds were diffeomorphic to spheres, and he hoped to apply it to prove the Poincaré Conjecture.   He needed to understand the singularities.

Hamilton created a list of possible singularities that could form, but he was concerned that some singularities might lead to difficulties. He wanted to cut the manifold at the singularities and paste in caps and then run the Ricci flow again, so he needed to understand the singularities and show that certain kinds of singularities do not occur.  Perelman discovered the singularities were all very simple: essentially three-dimensional cylinders made out of spheres stretched out along a line. An ordinary cylinder is made by taking circles stretched along a line.  Perelman proved this using something called the "Reduced Volume," which is closely related to an eigenvalue of a certain elliptic equation.

Sometimes, an otherwise complicated operation reduces to multiplication by a scalar (a number). Such numbers are called eigenvalues of that operation.  Eigenvalues are closely related to vibration frequencies and are used in analyzing a famous problem: can you hear the shape of a drum? Essentially, an eigenvalue is like a note being played by the manifold. Perelman proved this note goes up as the manifold is deformed by the Ricci flow. This helped him eliminate some of the more troublesome singularities that had concerned Hamilton, particularly the cigar soliton solution, which looked like a strand sticking out of a manifold with nothing on the other side. In essence, Perelman showed that all the strands that form can be cut and capped and none stick out on one side only.

Completing the proof, Perelman takes any compact, simply connected, three-dimensional manifold without boundary and starts to run the Ricci flow. This deforms the manifold into round pieces with strands running between them. He cuts the strands and continues deforming the manifold until, eventually, he is left with a collection of round three-dimensional spheres. Then, he rebuilds the original manifold by connecting the spheres together with three-dimensional cylinders, morphs them into a round shape, and sees that, despite all the initial confusion, the manifold was, in fact, homeomorphic to a sphere.

One immediate question posed was how one could be sure that infinitely many cuts are not necessary. This was raised due to the cutting potentially progressing forever. Perelman proved this cannot happen by using minimal surfaces on the manifold. A minimal surface is essentially a soap film. Hamilton had shown that the area of a minimal surface decreases as the manifold undergoes Ricci flow.  Perelman verified what happened to the area of the minimal surface when the manifold was sliced.  He proved that, eventually, the area is so small that any cut after the area is that small can only be chopping off three-dimensional spheres and not more complicated pieces. This is described as a battle with a Hydra by Sormani in Szpiro's book cited below. This last part of the proof appeared in Perelman's third and final paper on the subject.

References

Further reading
 
 
 
 
 
 
 
 
 
 

External links

"The Poincaré Conjecture" – BBC Radio 4 programme In Our Time'', 2 November 2006. Contributors June Barrow-Green, Lecturer in the History of Mathematics at the Open University, Ian Stewart, Professor of Mathematics at the University of Warwick, Marcus du Sautoy, Professor of Mathematics at the University of Oxford, and presenter Melvyn Bragg.

Geometric topology
3-manifolds
Theorems in topology
Millennium Prize Problems
Conjecture
Conjectures that have been proved
1904 introductions